Johan Ulf Tobias Büser (born 1983) is a Swedish politician and member of the Riksdag, the national legislature. A member of the Social Democratic Party, he has represented Gothenburg Municipality since September 2014.

Büser is the son of toolmaker Ulf Nygren and business manager Annika Büser. He studied law at the Gothenburg School of Business, Economics and Law, University of Gothenburg. He has worked as a forklift driver, fitter and school teacher. He held various roles at the Swedish Social Democratic Youth League (SSU) before entering the Riksdag. He had previously been a member of the board of the Port of Gothenburg.

References

1983 births
Living people
Members of the Riksdag 2014–2018
Members of the Riksdag 2018–2022
Members of the Riksdag 2022–2026
Members of the Riksdag from the Social Democrats
Politicians from Gothenburg
Swedish schoolteachers
University of Gothenburg alumni